The coat of arms of the French region of Alsace is a combination of the historic coats of arms of Départements Haut-Rhin and Bas-Rhin.

History

See also
Flag of Alsace

References

Alsace
Culture in Alsace
French heraldry
German heraldry